The Traetta Prize is an award assigned by the Traetta Society in recognition of achievements in the rediscovery of the roots of European music. It owes its name to the composer Tommaso Traetta (1727–1779) and is awarded each year during the Traetta Week, a festival dedicated to the composer that takes place during the eight days between the day of his birth to that of his death. (30 March – 6 April)

Traetta was one of the main composers of the Neapolitan School, who despite the huge success in life for his compositions has been unjustly unrecognised, along with other composers of the time, for his contribution to classical music by the music historiography of German origin, who founded the basics of classical music mostly on Germanic authors.

The objective of the Prize is to reward people who have committed themselves in expanding the knowledge of the musical production of the eighteenth century. The Prize borrows the name of Traetta as a symbol of a large list of composers unjustly forgotten such as Leonardo Vinci, Pasquale Anfossi, Antonio Sacchini, Nicola Vaccai, Leonardo Leo, Domenico Cimarosa or Vicente Martín y Soler among others.

Winners 
 2022 – Luca Bianchini and Anna Trombetta, Italy
 2021 – Núria Rial, Spain
 2020 – Diego Fasolis, Switzerland
 2019 – Olga Peretyatko, Russia
 2018 – Jenny Drivala, Greece
 2017 – Mathias Augustyniak + Michael Amzalag, France
 2016 – Werner Schroeter, Germany
 2015 – Bejun Mehta, US
 2014 – María Bayo, Spain
 2013 – Christophe Rousset, France
 2012 – Alan Curtis, US
 2011 – René Jacobs, Belgium
 2010 – Jolando Scarpa, Italy
 2009 – Mario Moretti, Italy

References

External links

Classical music awards
Italian music awards